Selaginella gigantea (family Selaginellaceae) is a spikemoss endemic to the montane rainforests of Venezuela, at an altitude of around .

References 

gigantea